Calliephialtes is a genus of ichneumon wasps in the family Ichneumonidae. There are 22 described species in Calliephialtes.

Species
There are 22 species belonging to the genus Calliephialtes:

 Calliephialtes argentinus Blanchard, 1936 c g
 Calliephialtes bicolor (Brulle, 1846) c g
 Calliephialtes braconoides (Spinola, 1851) c g
 Calliephialtes coxatus (Smith, 1879) c g
 Calliephialtes deyanirae Gauld, 1991 c g
 Calliephialtes dimorphus Cushman, 1938 c g
 Calliephialtes exilis (Brulle, 1846) c g
 Calliephialtes ferrugineus Cushman, 1940 c g b
 Calliephialtes grapholithae (Cresson, 1890) c g
 Calliephialtes guevarae Gauld, 1991 c g
 Calliephialtes ledezmae Gauld, Ugalde & Hanson, 1998 c g
 Calliephialtes lopezi Gauld, 1991 c g
 Calliephialtes marjorieae Gauld, 1991 c g
 Calliephialtes mattai Porter, 1979 c g
 Calliephialtes minutus (Brulle, 1846) c g
 Calliephialtes notanda (Cresson, 1870) c g (as C. notandus b)
 Calliephialtes perpulcher (Schrottky, 1902) c g
 Calliephialtes picadoi Gauld, 1991 c g
 Calliephialtes rojasi Gauld, Ugalde & Hanson, 1998 c g
 Calliephialtes ruizi Gauld, 1991 c g
 Calliephialtes sittenfeldae Gauld, Ugalde & Hanson, 1998 c g
 Calliephialtes thurberiae Cushman, 1915 c g

Data sources: i = ITIS, c = Catalogue of Life, g = GBIF, b = Bugguide.net

References

Further reading

 
 

Pimplinae